Dumbarton is one of the six wards used to elect members of the West Dunbartonshire Council. It elects four Councillors.

The ward covers most of the town of Dumbarton, including the outlying villages of Milton and Bowling on the Firth of Clyde, but excepting northern parts of Dumbarton such as Bellsmyre, Broadmeadow and Lomondgate which are assigned to the Leven ward.

Councillors

Election Results

2022 Election
2022 West Dunbartonshire Council election

2017 Election
2017 West Dunbartonshire Council election

2012 Election
2012 West Dunbartonshire Council election

2007 Election
2007 West Dunbartonshire Council election

References

Wards of West Dunbartonshire
Dumbarton
Firth of Clyde